The Surgery of Touch is the sixth album by composer Paul Schütze, released in 1994 through Sentrax.

Track listing

Personnel 
Denis Blackham – mastering
Paul McDermott – painting
Paul Schütze – instruments, production
Jörg Willich – design

References

External links 
 

1994 albums
Paul Schütze albums
Albums produced by Paul Schütze